Dəvrallı is a village in the municipality of Tapan in the Dashkasan Rayon of Azerbaijan.

References

Populated places in Dashkasan District